Robert Allan Attwell (born December 26, 1959) was an American-born Canadian professional ice hockey player who played 22 games in the National Hockey League with the Colorado Rockies between 1979 and 1981.

Personal life
Attwell was born in Spokane, Washington, but grew up in Toronto, Ontario.

His father, Ron Attwell, and two of his uncles (Bill McCreary Sr. and Keith McCreary) also played in the NHL. Bill McCreary Jr., his cousin, alo played in the NHL.

Career statistics

Regular season and playoffs

References 
 

1959 births
Living people
Augsburger Panther players
BSC Preussen Berlin players
Canadian ice hockey right wingers
Colorado Rockies (NHL) draft picks
Colorado Rockies (NHL) players
EC Bad Tölz players
Fort Wayne Komets players
Fort Worth Texans players
Heilbronner EC players
Ice hockey people from Washington (state)
Moncton Alpines (AHL) players
Peterborough Petes (ice hockey) players
Sportspeople from Spokane, Washington
Ice hockey people from Toronto